Armagh Observatory is an astronomical research institute in Armagh, Northern Ireland. Around 25 astronomers are based at the observatory, studying stellar astrophysics, the Sun, Solar System astronomy and  Earth's climate.

In 2018, Armagh Observatory was recognized for having 224 years of unbroken weather records.

History
It was founded in 1789 by The Most Rev. and Rt Hon. The 1st Baron Rokeby, Church of Ireland Lord Primate of All Ireland and Lord Archbishop of Armagh.

In 1795 through 1797 Solar observations were made at Armagh, including measurements of sunspots.

Ernst Julius Öpik (grandfather of Lembit Öpik MP) was based here for over 30 years and among his many contributions to astrophysics he wrote of the dangers of an asteroid impacting on the Earth.

One of the observatory's directors, Thomas Robinson invented the cup anemometer. (a device for measuring wind speed)

In 1949, a plan was put forth to establish an Armagh Planetarium. Eventually, in 1968 the Planetarium was founded, under its first Director, Patrick Moore. It celebrated its 50th anniversary in 2018.

In 2018, the observatory was given an award by Centennial Weather Station Award from the World Meteorological Organisation for 224 years of unbroken weather recordings. The records go back to 1794 and are also made available on the internet in the early 21st century.

In modern times the Observatory along with the nearby Planetarium and 14-acre Astropark are noted tourist attraction and education centre. The gardens, historical telescopes, and various astronomically related devices such as sundials are among some of the exhibits for visitors.

Facilities
There are scale models of the Solar System and the Universe, two sundials and historic telescopes, as well as telescope domes and other outdoor exhibits. The Human Orrery, launched in 2004, is located close to the main Observatory building. The Observatory's specialist library and archives, and collections of scientific instruments and artefacts associated with the development of modern astronomy, represent one of the leading collections of its kind in the British Isles.

Instruments 

A Troughton refracting telescope of 2.5 inch aperture was installed in a dome in 1795. The telescope was manufactured by J & E Troughton of London, and is noted for its late 18th century brass metal work. This is also called the Troughton Equatorial Telescope, for having an equatorial mounting.

The observatory has an Earnshaw Regulator. It is a type of clock invented in 1791 by Thomas Earnshaw which was valued for its accuracy.  Earnshaw travelled with it to Armagh to set it up in the new Observatory.

In the early 1800s it was reported to have a mural circle instrument. Another instrument at the observatory is a sunshine recorder.

In the 1830s the observatory bought a 15-inch reflecting telescope from the Grubb Telescope Company. The telescope used a metal mirror mounted on an equatorial mount with clockwork-drive.

In 1885, a ten-inch aperture objective lens telescope was installed, also a Grubb telescope. This was installed in the Robinson dome.

The observatory also has some meridian marks in the area, which look like stone arches that were used to mark the location of the meridian for astronomical instruments. There is also another that is an iron obelisk. The first meridian mark was built in 1793, and is in Tullyard, and it was used with the transit instrument.

In 2005, two wide-angle cameras for a meteor detection systems were installed.

Research
The records of temperature take at Armagh Observatory between 1844 and 2004 were analyzed in 2006 research paper.

List of directors

See also
Royal Astronomical Society
Markree Observatory (Irish observatory 1830s-1900, discovered 9 Metis)
List of astronomical observatories
List of largest optical telescopes in the British Isles

References

External links

A Visit to Armagh Observatory, AAVSO

Infrastructure completed in 1789
Astronomical observatories in Northern Ireland
Observatory
Tourist attractions in County Armagh
Science museums in Northern Ireland
Grade A listed buildings
1789 establishments in Ireland
Research institutes in the United Kingdom
Astronomy institutes and departments